Lidiya Loginova (born 27 February 1951) is a former volleyball player for the USSR. Born in Kazan, she competed for the Soviet Union at the 1980 Summer Olympics.

References 

1951 births
Living people
Soviet women's volleyball players
Olympic volleyball players of the Soviet Union
Olympic gold medalists for the Soviet Union
Olympic medalists in volleyball
Medalists at the 1980 Summer Olympics
Volleyball players at the 1980 Summer Olympics